Saeen Ahmad Khan Tariq (25 September 1924 – 10 February 2017), was a prominent Baloch-Saraiki poet.

Books
He was known for the following books:
Gharoon Dar Taannee
Mattaan Maal Wallay
Maikoon See Laggday
Sussi
Main Kia Aakhaan
Hath Jorri Jjul
Bbaytt Dee Khushboo
Umraan Daa Porhiya

References

1924 births
2017 deaths
Saraiki-language poets
Saraiki people
People from Dera Ghazi Khan District
Saraiki-language writers